Biçerova station is a railway station on the Northern Line of the IZBAN commuter rail system. The station is also a transfer center for buses to Yenifoça on the Aegean Sea.

Biçerova was built in 1996 by the Turkish State Railways and closed to passenger traffic in 2006. On 30 January 2011, passenger service resumed with the extension of the Northern Line to Aliağa.

Bus connections
ESHOT
 745 Biçerova Aktarma - Yenifoça
 753 Biçerova Aktarma - Gerenköy

References

Railway stations in İzmir Province
Railway stations opened in 1996
1996 establishments in Turkey
Aliağa District